The 2019 EAFF E-1 Football Championship was the seventh edition of the women's tournament of the EAFF E-1 Football Championship, the women's football championship of East Asia. It was  held in South Korea in December 2019.

On 30 October 2019, EAFF announced that North Korea, who automatically qualified for the final round, withdrew from the tournament; Chinese Taipei was chosen as the replacement.

Teams
Based on FIFA Women's world ranking, ten teams were allocated to their particular stage. Each winner of the preliminary round progressed to the next stage.

Venues

Tiebreakers
The ranking of teams was determined as follows:
Points in head-to-head matches among tied teams;
Goal difference in head-to-head matches among tied teams;
Goals scored in head-to-head matches among tied teams;
If more than two teams are tied, and after applying all head-to-head criteria above, a subset of teams are still tied, all head-to-head criteria above are reapplied exclusively to this subset of teams;
Goal difference in all group matches;
Goals scored in all group matches;
Penalty shoot-out if only two teams are tied and they met in the last round of the group;
Disciplinary points (yellow card = 1 point, red card as a result of two yellow cards = 3 points, direct red card = 3 points, yellow card followed by direct red card = 4 points);
Drawing of lots.

First preliminary round
The first preliminary round was held in Mongolia.

Table

Matches
All times are local (UTC+8).

Awards

Second preliminary round

The second preliminary round was held in December 2018 in Guam from December 1 to 5.

Table

Matches
All times are local (UTC+10).

Awards

Final round

The final competition was held in South Korea from 10 to 17 December 2019.

Squads

Table

Matches

All times are local (UTC+9).

Awards

Goalscorers

Broadcasting
 : CCTV, PPTV, Guangdong Sports
 : NHK
 : Cable TV, Fantastic Television
 : 
 : SPOTV, MBN(South Korean male national team matches only)

References

External links
Official website of the first preliminary round
Official website of the second preliminary round
Official website of the final round

2019
East Asian Cup
International association football competitions hosted by South Korea
EAFF E-1 Football Championship (women)
EAFF
EAFF